Hunsur Krishnamurthy (9 February 1914  – 13 February 1989) was an Indian playwright, film director, producer, actor, screenwriter and lyricist in Kannada cinema.

He worked with noted theatre personalities early in his career; Gubbi Veeranna, Mohammed Peer and B. R. Panthulu before entering films. As a film director, he made films mostly in the mythological genre such as Satya Harishchandra (1965), Bhakta Kumbara (1974) and Babruvahana (1977), all of which star Rajkumar. The films were major critical and commercial successes and are seen as milestones in Kannada cinema and in the career of Rajkumar.

Career

Theatre
Prior to working in films, Krishnamurthy worked in theatre as a playwright, writing plays such as Swarga Samrajya. He then worked for the Bangalore-based Bharat Nataka Company as a playwright and a scenarist, following which, he had a stint at Bombay Talkies. He then worked as a part of Marathi stage actor Bal Gandharva's theatre troupe. During that time, he also worked with famed Kannada theatre personalities Gubbi Veeranna and Mohamed Peer. In 1936, during his work with the latter in his drama company Chandrakala Natak, he worked with B. R. Panthulu, another popular theatre personality at the time, in his play Samsara Nauke, as an assistant director.

Films
Krishnamurthy entered the Kannada cinema primarily as a dialogue writer for films such as Hemareddy Mallamma (1945) and Krishnaleele (1947). He also wrote the screenplay for the films. Writing lyrics for the soundtracks of films such as Kanyadana, (1954), Devakannika (1954) and Sodari (1955), he made his debut as a director in the 1958 mythological film Shree Krishna Gaarudi, that features Rajkumar in the lead role, an actor who would go on to dominate Kannada cinema as an actor for over two decades. Krishnamurthy followed this up with other films such as Veera Sankalpa (1964), Satya Harishchandra (1965), Sri Kannika Parameshwari Kathe (1966), Bhakta Kumbara (1974), Babruvahana (1977), Bhakta Siriyala (1980), Bhakta Dnyanadeva (1982) and Shiva Kotta Sowbhagya (1985). Most of his films in the mythological genre had Rajkumar playing the lead role. Commercial successes during the time, they were instrumental in shaping Rajkumar's career as an actor. His film Satya Harishchandra won the National Film Award for Best Feature Film in Kannada at the 13th National Film Awards, and is seen as a milestone in Kannada cinema. His 1977 film Veera Sindhoora Lakshmana, which was based on the life of Lakshmana, a freedom fighter who fought the British during the Indian freedom struggle, was major commercial success.

Actors M. P. Shankar and Rajesh were introduced by him in his films; Shankar in Rathnamanjari (1962) and Rajesh in Veera Sankalpa.

Filmography

Awards

National Film Awards
 1965 - Best Kannada Film – Sathya Harishchandra
 1965 - Third Best Kannada Film – Maduve Madi Nodu
Karnataka State Film Awards
 1973-74 - Best Dialogue Writer – Boothayyana Maga Ayyu
 1974-75 - Third Best Film – Bhaktha Kumbara
 1981-82 - Best Dialogue Writer – Edeyooru Siddalingeshwara
 1986-87 - Lt. Puttanna Kanagal Award

References

External links
 

1914 births
1977 deaths
Kannada dramatists and playwrights
Kannada screenwriters
Kannada-language lyricists
Kannada film directors
Kannada film producers
Male actors in Kannada cinema
Place of death missing
20th-century Indian male actors
Male actors from Karnataka
Screenwriters from Karnataka
People from Mysore district
20th-century Indian poets
Indian male dramatists and playwrights
20th-century Indian dramatists and playwrights
Film producers from Karnataka
Indian male film actors
Poets from Karnataka
Malayalam film producers
20th-century Indian male writers
20th-century Indian screenwriters